Stavanger Buss-Selskap was a Norwegian bus company responsible for operating the city bus of Stavanger. It was created on 10 July 1937 and operated until 1975 when it was taken over by Stavanger og Omegn Trafikkselskap. To begin with the company had 11 buses, but soon increased to more. Between 1947 and 1963 it also operated the Stavanger trolleybus with five buses.

References 

Defunct bus companies of Norway
Trolleybus transport in Norway
Bus companies of Rogaland
Companies based in Stavanger
Transport companies established in 1937
Transport companies disestablished in 1975
Norwegian companies established in 1937
1975 disestablishments in Norway